Calle Erik Steén (born 16 May 1980) is a Swedish former professional ice hockey player.

Steen was drafted in the 1998 NHL Entry Draft in the 5th round as the 142nd pick overall by the Detroit Red Wings. At that time he played for Hammarby IF in the second highest league in Sweden, Allsvenskan. But only playing five games in the 1998/99 season Steen moved leaguerival Mora IK in the summer of 1999.
He stayed only one season with Mora and then moved to the Finnish SM-Liiga club JyP Jyvaskyla. But he did not stay there for long a time, after only five games he moved back to Sweden and Bofors IK of Allsvenskan. And finally he got some success. He stayed in Bofors for two and half season, in the final season he played alongside his brother Oscar. Then Bofors traded him to Färjestads BK of the Elitserien. Steen made a good playoffs 
with Färjestad, 6 points in 12 games. The following season he played for Färjestad, except a 4-games-loan to Bofors. He also played the 2004/05 season with Färjestad and once again he played together with his brother Oscar, who had been traded to Färjestad in January 2006. But after the season he and his brother wanted a better contract, and Färjestad wasn't willing get them a better contract, so the brothers instead signed with leaguerivals Leksands IF.  But after the 2005/05 season Leksand was relegated from Elitserien to Allsvenskan.  He then moved to fellow Allsvenskan side Södertälje SK in 2006 before joining the Malmö Redhawks in 2007.

Due to several knee injuries, he announced his retirement on 25 August 2009.

Calle Steen is engaged for marriage with the Swedish diver Anna Lindberg and together they have one son, Yelverton, born in 2009.

Awards and achievements 
 SM-silver Medal 2003, 2004, 2005

Career statistics

External links

References

1980 births
Living people
Swedish ice hockey centres
Detroit Red Wings draft picks
Färjestad BK players
Bofors IK players
Leksands IF players
Ice hockey people from Stockholm